Linda Charlotta Sällström (born 13 July 1988) is a Finnish international footballer. She currently plays for Vittsjö GIK in the Damallsvenskan and the Finland women's national football team.

Career
She made her debut for the senior Finland team on 31 May 2007; playing 17 minutes against Norway.

Sällström missed the entire 2012 season with an anterior cruciate ligament injury. She re–injured the knee in March 2013 and was ruled out of contention for a place in Finland's UEFA Women's Euro 2013 squad.

On 25 January 2014 Sällstrom injured her anterior cruciate ligament (ACL) again, making it likely she would miss the 2014 season.

In total Sällström has endured three ACL injuries in her career. Coming back from injury to finish as second highest goalscorer in the 2017–18 Damallsvenskan season.

On 8 October 2019, Sällström scored four goals against Albania to become the all-time top scorer for Finland, surpassing Laura Österberg Kalmari.

On 7 November 2019, Sällström played her 100th match against Cyprus.

Personal life
Sällström is openly lesbian.

International goals
 

Correct as of 24 July 2022

References

External links
Linda Sällström Linköpings FC profile

Player's profile at Football Association of Finland 

1988 births
Living people
Expatriate women's footballers in Sweden
Finnish women's footballers
Footballers from Helsinki
Finnish expatriate footballers
Finland women's international footballers
Swedish-speaking Finns
Damallsvenskan players
Linköpings FC players
Djurgårdens IF Fotboll (women) players
Paris FC (women) players
Vittsjö GIK players
Women's association football forwards
Expatriate women's footballers in France
Finnish expatriate sportspeople in France
Division 1 Féminine players
Finnish expatriate sportspeople in Sweden
FIFA Century Club
Lesbian sportswomen
LGBT association football players
UEFA Women's Euro 2022 players